Trentino Rosa is an Italian women's volleyball club based in Pergine Valsugana and currently playing in the Serie A2.

Previous names

Due to sponsorship, the club have competed under the following names:
 Delta Informatica Trentino (2012–present)

History
The club was established in 2008, when its founder Roberto Postal decided to take the first team of Mattarello's club Polisportiva Torrefranca to a more focused path and bring together the best players in the region. After received the first team rights, Roberto Postal created  which was based in Mattarello. The club started in the Serie B1 (third division) and in 2009 it started a collaboration with Trentino Volley which enhanced the team culminating with a promotion to Serie A2 at the end of the 2010–11 season. Due to financial problems the club was forced to renounce the promotion and its rights to play the Serie A2. The club relocates from Mattarello to Pergine Valsugana and restarted in the 2012–13 from Serie B1 with the sponsorship of Delta Informatica reaching promotion to Serie A2 in the following season. In 2015–16 the club lost the promotion playoff final to Saugella Team Monza, missing a promotion to Serie A1.

Team
Season 2017–2018, as of September 2017.

References

External links

 Official website 

Italian women's volleyball clubs
Volleyball clubs established in 2008
2008 establishments in Italy
Sport in Trentino